was an autobahn in Germany. It has been redesignated as a part of the A 36 as of January 1, 2019.

The A 395 began at an interchange with the A 39 and B 248 south of Brunswick (Braunschweig). From there, the road headed in a general southerly direction, bypassing Wolfenbüttel, Schladen and other, smaller towns.

The southern end of the A 395 came in the town of Vienenburg, at a trumpet interchange with a freeway portion of the B 6/B 6n. The B 6 continues to the south and west towards Goslar and the B 4, while the B 6n continues east towards Leipzig, eventually meeting with the A 14.

The A 395 was the longest three-digit autobahn in Germany, although it was formerly 7 km longer. In 2001, the section of autobahn from Bad Harzburg to Schlewecke became the northernmost part of the B 4, while the section of freeway from that point to the current southern terminus was returned to the B 6. It was designated as A 369 in 2019.

The northernmost 400 m of the A 395, between the junctions Braunschweig-Melverode and  Braunschweig-Süd, was not considered to be part of the autobahn system. There is an at-grade entrance and exit from a large car dealership and gas station along the southbound side of the road just before Braunschweig-Melverode. Therefore, the A 395 was officially considered to start immediately after that junction, and thus also had no connection to the remaining autobahn network.

Exit list

 

 

 

 

|}

External links
 Autobahn Atlas: A395

References 

395
A395
Transport in Braunschweig